Zoran Vukčević  (born 7 February 1972) is a retired Montenegrin footballer who played as a forward.

Club career
In July 1993, Vukčević joined Ulsan Hyundai FC in K League.

References

External links

1972 births
Living people
Yugoslav footballers
Serbian expatriate footballers
Association football forwards
Ulsan Hyundai FC players
K League 1 players